Nelkis Teresa Casabona González (born 12 May 1984) is a Cuban track and field sprinter who specialises in the 200 metres. She has a personal best of 22.97 seconds for the event. She represented Cuba at the World Championships in Athletics and Pan American Games in 2011.

Casabona was born and raised in Pueblo Nuevo, one of three neighborhoods of the city of Matanzas, in Cuba's Matanzas Province. In her first international appearance she finished fourth in the 200 m final at the 2001 World Youth Championships in Athletics, but was disqualified for a lane infraction. It was not until 2009 that she began to make her impact on the Cuban senior ranks. That year she ran personal bests of 11.62 seconds for the 100 metres and 23.84 seconds for the 200 m. She was runner-up over 200 m at the 2009 ALBA Games, held in Havana, and helped the Cuban women win the 4×100 metres relay. She did not run abroad in 2010; her season was highlighted by a 100 m win at the Barrientos Memorial and new best of 11.39 seconds for the distance.

The 2011 season proved to be a breakthrough one for Casabona. She improved her 100 m best to 11.31 seconds then won both sprints at the Barrientos Memorial. She won the 100 m, 200 m and 4 × 100 m relay events at the 2011 ALBA Games. She broke the games record times in the events and dipped under twenty-three seconds for the first time in the 200 m final, running 22.97 seconds. Her global senior debut followed at the 2011 World Championships in Athletics: she was knocked out in the 100 m heats, but reached the 200 m final. An appearance at the 2011 Pan American Games closed her season and she was a finalist in both sprints as well as part of the fourth-placed Cuban relay team.

She won both Cuban sprint titles in 2012 and placed seventh in the 200 m at the 2012 Ibero-American Championships in Athletics. She was chosen to run the 200 m for the Cuban team at the 2012 London Olympics.

Personal bests
100 m: 11.31 s –  Havana, 12 May 2011
200 m: 22.97 s (wind: +2.0 m/s) –  Barquisimeto, 29 July 2011

Achievements

References

External links

Sports reference biography
Tilastopaja biography
Ecured biography (in Spanish)

Living people
1984 births
Cuban female sprinters
People from Matanzas Province
Pan American Games competitors for Cuba
Athletes (track and field) at the 2011 Pan American Games
Athletes (track and field) at the 2012 Summer Olympics
Olympic athletes of Cuba
Olympic female sprinters